Qasem Beygi (also Romanized as Qāsem Beygī and Qāsem Begī; also known as ʿAlīdād) is a village in Kuhdasht-e Shomali Rural District, in the Central District of Kuhdasht County, Lorestan Province, Iran. At the 2006 census, its population was 70, in 13 families.

References 

Towns and villages in Kuhdasht County